

This is a list of bolete species found in North America.

Bolding of the species name, and an asterisk (*) following indicate the species is the type species of that genus.

Aureoboletus
Aureoboletus auriporus
Aureoboletus gentilis
Aureoboletus innixus
Aureoboletus mirabilis
Aureoboletus projectellus
Aureoboletus roxanae

Austroboletus

Austroboletus betula
Austroboletus gracilis
Austroboletus subflavipes

Baorangia
Baorangia bicolor

Boletinellus merulioides
Boletinellus merulioides

Boletellus

Boletellus ananas
Boletellus chrysenteroides
Boletellus flocculosipes
Boletellus intermedius
Boletellus pseudochrysenteroides
Boletellus russellii

Boletus

Boletus aereus
Boletus albisulphureus
Boletus alutaceus
Boletus amyloideus
Boletus atkinsonii
Boletus aurantiosplendens
Boletus aureissimus
Boletus auriflammeus
Boletus auripes
Boletus auriporus
Boletus austrinus – Mexico
Boletus barrowsii
Boletus bicoloroides
Boletus carminiporus
Boletus citriniporus
Boletus coccyginus
Boletus coniferarum
Boletus curtisii
Boletus discolor
Boletus dryophilus
Boletus edulis *
Boletus fagicola
Boletus fairchildianus
Boletus fibrillosus
Boletus flammans
Boletus flaviporus
Boletus flavissimus – Mexico
Boletus fraternus
Boletus gentilis
Boletus gertrudiae
Boletus glabellus
Boletus griseus
Boletus harrisonii
Boletus hematinus
Boletus hemichrysus
Boletus holoxanthus
Boletus hortonii
Boletus huronensis
Boletus hypocarycinus
Boletus hypoxanthus
Boletus insuetus
Boletus lewisii
Boletus lignicola
Boletus longicurvipes
Boletus luridellus
Boletus mahogonicolor
Boletus melleoluteus
Boletus miniato-olivaceus
Boletus miniato-pallescens
Boletus morrisii
Boletus mottiae
Boletus nobilis
Boletus nobilissimus
Boletus ochraceoluteus
Boletus oliveisporus
Boletus ornatipes
Boletus pallidoroseus
Boletus pallidus
Boletus patrioticus
Boletus pinophilus
Boletus pseudoboletinus
Boletus pseudo-olivaceus
Boletus pseudopeckii
Boletus pulchriceps
Boletus purpureorubellus
Boletus reticulatus
Boletus roodyi
Boletus roseipes
Boletus roseolateritius
Boletus roseopurpureus
Boletus rubriceps
Boletus rubricitrinus
Boletus rubroflammeus
Boletus rubropunctus
Boletus rufocinnamomeus
Boletus rufomaculatus
Boletus sensibilis
Boletus separans
Boletus smithii
Boletus spadiceus
Boletus speciosus
Boletus sphaerocephalus
Boletus subcaerulescens
Boletus subdepauperatus
Boletus subfraternus
Boletus subgraveolens
Boletus subluridellus
Boletus subluridus
Boletus subvelutipes
Boletus truncatus
Boletus variipes
Boletus vermiculosoides
Boletus vermiculosus
Boletus viscidocurrugis

Butyriboletus
Butyriboletus abieticola
Butyriboletus appendiculatus
Butyriboletus autumniregius
Butyriboletus persolidus
Butyriboletus primiregius
Butyriboletus querciregius
Butyriboletus regius

Caloboletus

Caloboletus calopus
Caloboletus firmus
Caloboletus frustosus
Caloboletus inedulis
Caloboletus peckii
Caloboletus rubripes

Chalciporus

Chalciporus piperatoides
Chalciporus piperatus
Chalciporus pseudorubinellus
Chalciporus rubinellus
Chalciporus rubritubifer

Cyanoboletus
Cyanoboletus pulverulentus
Cyanoboletus rainisii

Exsudoporus

Exsudoporus floridanus
Exsudoporus frostii

Fistulinella
Fistulinella mexicana – Mexico

Fuscoboletinus

Fuscoboletinus glandulosus
Fuscoboletinus grisellus
Fuscoboletinus laricinus
Fuscoboletinus ochraceoroseus
Fuscoboletinus paluster
Fuscoboletinus serotinus
Fuscoboletinus spectabilis

Gastroboletus

Gastroboletus citrinobrunneus
Gastroboletus ruber
Gastroboletus subalpinus
Gastroboletus turbinatus
Gastroboletus xerocomoides

Gastroleccinum

Gastroleccinum scabrosum

Gastrosuillus

Gastrosuillus larinius

Gyrodon

Gyrodon lividus
Gyrodon merulioides
Gyrodon monticola – Mexico
Gyrodon proximus
Gyrodon rompelii

Gyroporus

Gyroporus castaneus
Gyroporus cyanescens
Gyroporus phaeocyanescens
Gyroporus purpurinus
Gyroporus subalbellus
Gyroporus umbrinosquamosus – Mexico

Heimioporus

Heimioporus betula

Hemileccinum
Hemileccinum subglabripes

Hortiboletus

Hortiboletus campestris
Hortiboletus rubellus

Imleria
Imleria badia

Lanmaoa
Lanmaoa carminipes
Lanmaoa pseudosensibilis

Leccinum

Leccinum aeneum
Leccinum alaskanum
Leccinum albellum
Leccinum arbuticola
Leccinum arctostaphylos
Leccinum arenicola
Leccinum areolatum
Leccinum armeniacum
Leccinum atrostipitatum
Leccinum aurantiacum *
Leccinum barrowsii
Leccinum californicum
Leccinum carpini
Leccinum chalybaeum
Leccinum discolor
Leccinum fibrillosum
Leccinum flavostipitatum
Leccinum griseonigrum
Leccinum holopus
Leccinum idahoense
Leccinum insigne
Leccinum insolens
Leccinum largentii
Leccinum luteum
Leccinum manzanitae
Leccinum montanum
Leccinum nigrescens
Leccinum oxydabile
Leccinum ponderosum
Leccinum potteri
Leccinum pseudoinsigne
Leccinum roseofractum
Leccinum roseoscabrum
Leccinum rotundifoliae
Leccinum rugosiceps
Leccinum scabrum
Leccinum snellii
Leccinum sphaerocystis – Mexico
Leccinum subalpinum
Leccinum subgranulosum
Leccinum subleucophaeum
Leccinum subtestaceum
Leccinum tablense
Leccinum testaceoscabrum

Meiorganum

Meiorganum curtisii

Neoboletus

Neoboletus luridiformis
Neoboletus pseudosulphureus

Paragyrodon

Paragyrodon sphaerosporus

Phlebopus

Phlebopus brasiliensis – Mexico
Phlebopus colossus – Mexico

Phylloporus

Phylloporus arenicola
Phylloporus boletinoides
Phylloporus foliiporus – Mexico
Phylloporus leucomycelinus
Phylloporus rhodoxanthus

Porphyrellus

Porphyrellus alveolatus – Mexico
Porphyrellus heterospermus – Mexico

Pseudoboletus

Pseudoboletus parasiticus

Pulveroboletus

Pulveroboletus caespitosus
Pulveroboletus curtisii
Pulveroboletus melleoluteus
Pulveroboletus ravenelii

Retiboletus

Retiboletus retipes

Rubroboletus

Rubroboletus haematinus
Rubroboletus pulcherrimus
Rubroboletus rhodosanguineus
Rubroboletus satanas

Strobilomyces

Strobilomyces confusus
Strobilomyces dryophilus
Strobilomyces floccopus

Suillellus

Suillellus amygdalinus
Suillellus floridanus
Suillellus hypocarycinus
Suillellus luridus
Suillellus pictiformis

Suillus

Suillus albivelatus
Suillus americanus
Suillus anomalus
Suillus borealis
Suillus bovinus
Suillus brevipes
Suillus brunnescens
Suillus caerulescens
Suillus castanellus
Suillus cavipes
Suillus chiapasensis – Mexico
Suillus cothurnatus
Suillus decipiens
Suillus flavidus
Suillus flavo-granulatus
Suillus flavoluteus
Suillus fuscotomentosus
Suillus glanulosipes
Suillus granulatus
Suillus grevillei
Suillus helenae
Suillus hirtellus
Suillus intermedius
Suillus kaibabensis
Suillus lactifluus
Suillus lakei
Suillus luteus
Suillus neoalbidipes
Suillus occidentalis
Suillus pallidiceps
Suillus placidus
Suillus ponderosus
Suillus pseudobrevipes
Suillus punctatipes
Suillus punctipes
Suillus pungens
Suillus salmonicolor
Suillus sibiricus
Suillus spraguei
Suillus subalpinus
Suillus subalutaceus
Suillus subaureus
Suillus subolivaceus
Suillus tomentosus
Suillus wasatchicus

Sutorius

Sutorius eximius

Tylopilus

Tylopilus alboater
Tylopilus ammiratii
Tylopilus amylosporus
Tylopilus appalachiensis
Tylopilus atratus
Tylopilus atronicotianus
Tylopilus badiceps
Tylopilus ballouii
Tylopilus brachypus
Tylopilus chromapes
Tylopilus conicus
Tylopilus felleus * 
Tylopilus ferrugineus
Tylopilus griseocarneus
Tylopilus humilis
Tylopilus indecisus
Tylopilus intermedius
Tylopilus jalapensis
Tylopilus leucomycelinus – Mexico
Tylopilus minor
Tylopilus montoyae
Tylopilus nebulosus
Tylopilus peralbidus
Tylopilus plumbeoviolaceus
Tylopilus pseudoscaber
Tylopilus rhoadsiae
Tylopilus rhodoconius
Tylopilus rubrobrunneus
Tylopilus sordidus
Tylopilus subcellulosus
Tylopilus tabacinus
Tylopilus variobrunneus
Tylopilus vinosobrunneus
Tylopilus violatinctus
Tylopilus williamsii

Xanthoconium

Xanthoconium affine
Xanthoconium chattoogaense
Xanthoconium montaltoense
Xanthoconium purpureum
Xanthoconium stramineum

Xerocomellus
Xerocomellus atropurpureus
Xerocomellus chrysenteron
Xerocomellus diffractus
Xerocomellus zelleri

Xerocomus

Xerocomus caeruleonigrescens – Mexico
Xerocomus coccolobae – Mexico
Xerocomus cuneipes – Mexico
Xerocomus illudens
Xerocomus subtomentosus *
Xerocomus tenax

Citations

General references

 

Boletales
Boletes, North American